Michael Newton (September 16, 1951 – September 6, 2021) was an American author best known for his work on Don Pendleton's The Executioner book series.

Biography

Altogether, Newton published 357 books, which included 258 novels and 99 nonfiction books. He also published 91 nonfiction articles and 58 shorter pieces, including chapters in several best-selling true-crime anthologies.

In 2017 Newton received the Lifetime Achievement Peacemaker Award from Western Fictioneers, honoring his publication of 62 western novels.

Cryptozoology

Newton's Encyclopedia of Cryptozoology won the American Library Association's award for Outstanding Reference Work in 2006. The book features 2,744 entries
on cryptozoology with a glossary and lengthy bibliography. It was positively reviewed in The Quarterly Review of Biology as enjoyable reading and an important resource on the topic.

Bibliography

The Executioner
 #--: The Executioner's War Book (with Don Pendleton)
 #29: Command Strike (with Don Pendleton)
 #30: Cleveland Pipeline (with Don Pendleton)
 #31: Arizona Ambush (with Don Pendleton)
 #32: Tennessee Smash (with Don Pendleton)
 #38: Satan's Sabbath (with Don Pendleton)
 #41: The Violent Streets
 #45: Paramilitary Plot
 #49: Doomsday Disciples
 #55: Paradines Gauntlet
 #60: Sold for Slaughter
 #68: Prairie Fire
 #71: Blood Dues
 #75: The Bone Yard
 #77: Hollywood Hell 
 #81: Shock Waves
 #83: Missouri Deathwatch
 #89: Defenders and Believers
 #91: The Trial
 #100: Blood Testament
 #101: Eternal Triangle
 #103: Assault on Rome
 #106: Run to Ground
 #108: Time to Kill
 #111: The Fiery Cross
 #114: Cold Judgment
 #119: Line of Fire
 #124: Night Kill
 #129: Haitian Hit
 #133: Blood Run
 #142: Fatal Error
 #149: Blood Rules
 #151: Message to Medellin
 #155: Hawaiian Heat
 #162: Colors of Hell
 #165: Fire Sweep
 #170: Baja Blitz
 #186: Fire Burst
 #187: Cleansing Flame
 #190: Killing Range
 #194: Deadly Contest
 #200: Crisis Point
 #206: Hunting Cry
 #210: Fire Lash
 #211: Steel Claws
 #212: Ride the Beast
 #222: Patriot Gambit
 #223: Hour of Conflict
 #224: Call to Arms
 #229: Zero Tolerance
 #233: Tough Justice
 #249: Shadow Target
 #258: Target Lock
 #268: Shattered Trust
 #269: Shifting Shadows
 #270: Judgment Day
 #277: Dirty Mission
 #281: Blood Stone
 #287: Rogue Warrior
 #290: Pursued
 #300: Warrior's Requiem
 #303: Sea of Terror
 #308: Into the Fire
 #309: Flames of Fury
 #310: Killing Heat
 #317: Hour of Judgment
 #330: Dual Action
 #334: Jungle Justice
 #338: Nuclear Reaction
 #344: Primal Law
 #357: Extreme Justice
 #361: Final Resort
 #366: Pele's Fire

SuperBolan
 #5: Flight 741
 #8: Rogue Force
 #13: Flesh and Blood
 #19: Assault
 #29: Lethal Impact
 #36: Hellground
 #39: Blood Strike
 #41: Vendetta
 #43: Omega Game
 #47: Jungle Law
 #56: Terror Spin
 #64: Initiation
 #65: Cloud of Death
 #66: Termination Point
 #69: Vengeance
 #71: Killsport
 #79: Power of the Lance
 #80: A Dying Evil
 #88: Sleepers
 #93: Retaliation
 #107: Survival Reflex
 #111: State of Evil
 #116  Ripple Effect
 #124: Colony of Evil
 #129: Altered State

Stony Man
 #7: Stony Man VII
 #9: Strikepoint
 #11: Target America
 #15: Blood Debt
 #17: Vortex
 #28: Blood Star

The Destroyer
 #108: Bamboo Dragon
 #110: Never Say Die
 #132: Wolf's Bane
 #133: Troubled Water

as Lyle Brandt

The Gun Series
 The Gun (2002)
 Justice Gun (2003)
 Vengeance Gun (2004)
 Rebel Gun (2005) Bounty Gun (2006)

Lawman Series
 The Lawman (2007)
 Slade's Law (2008)
 Helltown (2008)
 Massacre Trail (2009)
 Hanging Judge (2009)
 Manhunt (2010)

Non-fiction

 How to Write Action Adventure Novels (1989)
 Armed and Dangerous: A Writer's Guide to Weapons (1990)
 Silent Rage (1994)
 The FBI and the KKK The FBI Encyclopedia The Encyclopedia of Forensic Science The Invisible Empire: The Ku Klux Klan in Florida (2001)
 The Encyclopedia of Bank Robberies, Heists, and Capers (2002)
 The Encyclopedia of Kidnappings (2002)
 The Encyclopedia of high-tech crime and crime-fighting (2004)
 Encyclopedia of Cryptozoology: A Global Guide to Hidden Animals and Their Pursuers (2005)
 The Encyclopedia of Conspiracies and Conspiracy Theories (2006)
 The Encyclopedia of Serial Killers (2006)
 The Encyclopedia of American Law Enforcement The Encyclopedia of Crime Scene Investigation (2008)
 The Encyclopedia of Unsolved Crimes (2009)
 Mr. Mob: The Life and Crimes of Moe Dalitz (2009)
 Criminal Justice: Crime and Criminals (2010)
 Criminal Justice: Crime-fighting and Crime Prevention'' (2010)

References

Reviews 
 Mason P. Review of Newton, Michael, The Ku Klux Klan in Mississippi: A History. // H-CivWar, H-Net Reviews. November, 2010. 
 Ortiz P. Review of The Invisible Empire: The Ku Klux Klan in Florida, by Michael Newton // Journal of Southern History. — 2004. — Vol. 70, № 4. — P. 949—950. — .
 Zuber G. Michael Newton. The Invisible Empire: The Ku Klux Klan in Florida. The Florida History and Culture Series. Gainesville: University Press of Florida. 2001. xiii+260 pages // The Journal of Southern Religion. — 2002. — Vol. 5.

External links 
Official website

1951 births
20th-century American non-fiction writers
21st-century American non-fiction writers
20th-century American novelists
21st-century American novelists
American male novelists
American male non-fiction writers
Cryptozoologists
Living people
Place of birth missing (living people)
Novelists from Indiana
20th-century American male writers
21st-century American male writers